The Global Commons Institute gci.org.uk was founded in the United Kingdom in 1990 by Aubrey Meyer and others to campaign for a fair way to tackle climate change.

It has in particular promoted the model of Contraction and Convergence of  emissions as a means to tackle climate change which has been adopted by the UN COP on Climate Change & some international religious organisations. Many of the founders and signatories to the first statement in favour of contraction and convergence were members of the Green Party.

See also
Jim Berreen
Aubrey Meyer
Contraction and Convergence

References

External links
Global Commons Institute

Environmental organisations based in the United Kingdom
Climate change organisations based in the United Kingdom
International environmental organizations